The 1875 Minnesota gubernatorial election was held on November 2, 1875 to elect the governor of Minnesota.

Results

References

1875
Minnesota
gubernatorial
November 1875 events